Walking Under Stars is the seventh studio album by Australian hip hop group Hilltop Hoods, released on 8 August 2014.

At the J Awards of 2014, the album was nominated for Australian Album of the Year.

Background
Prior to the release of the album, Hilltop Hoods referred to Walking Under Stars as a "companion piece" to previous album Drinking from the Sun, with both albums sharing similar themes, artwork and connected via a five-part narrative, entitled 'The Thirst', commencing with the opening track on Drinking from the Sun, "The Thirst Pt. 1" and concluding with "The Thirst Pt. 5" at the end of Walking Under Stars.

The first single, "Won't Let You Down", premiered on Triple J on 24 June 2014 and was officially released on 27 June. The album was released on 8 August 2014 and debuted at number one on the ARIA Charts, making it Hilltop Hood's fourth consecutive number one album. The album was certified gold (denoting over 35,000 sales) in Australia, shortly after release.

At the ARIA Music Awards of 2014, the album received three nominations and became the group's fifth consecutive release and fourth consecutive studio album to win Best Urban Album.

Track listing

Credits
 Recorded and mixed by DJ Debris
 Mastered by Neville Clarke
 Artwork by J. Englehardt

Charts and certifications

Weekly charts

Year-end charts

Decade-end charts

Certifications

References

Hilltop Hoods albums
2014 albums
ARIA Award-winning albums
Golden Era Records albums